Ken Coogan (born 1983) is an Irish hurler who played as a midfielder for the Kilkenny senior team.

Coogan joined the team during the 2003 championship and made just one appearance during his two seasons of inter-county hurling. During that time he won one All-Ireland winners' medal.

At club level, Coogan plays with the Tullaroan club.

References

1983 births
Living people
Tullaroan hurlers
Kilkenny inter-county hurlers
All-Ireland Senior Hurling Championship winners